A Place in the Sun is a 1916 British silent drama film directed by Laurence Trimble and starring Reginald Owen, Marguerite Blanche and Malcolm Cherry. In 1919 it was released in the United States by the Triangle Film Corporation.

Cast
 Reginald Owen as Stuart Capel
 Marguerite Blanche as Rosie Blair
 Malcolm Cherry as Dick Blair
 Lydia Bilbrook as Marjorie Capel
 Campbell Gullan as Arthur Blagden
 Lyston Lyle as Sir John Capel
 Frances Wetherall as Mrs. Moultrie
 John MacAndrews as Ben Goodge

References

Bibliography
 Low, Rachael. The History of British Film (Volume 3): The History of the British Film 1914 - 1918. Routledge, 2013.

External links
 

1916 films
British drama films
British silent feature films
1910s English-language films
Films directed by Laurence Trimble
1916 drama films
Films set in England
Butcher's Film Service films
1910s British films
Silent drama films